Ron Marshall may refer to:

Ron Marshall (footballer) (1915–2001), Australian footballer
Ron Marshall (politician), American politician, member of the Montana House of Representatives
Ron Marshall (actor), narrator of the Scholastic version of No Jumping on the Bed!